Olchówka may refer to the following villages in Poland:
 Olchówka, Lublin Voivodeship (east Poland)
 Olchówka, Podlaskie Voivodeship (north-east Poland)